Chanpeng Nontasin (born 9 October 1984) is a Thai road and track cyclist, who currently rides for UCI Women's Continental Team . Nontasin specialises in the individual time trial and points race disciplines of the sport.

Nontasin represented Thailand at the 2008 Summer Olympics in Beijing, where she competed in the women's road race. She completed the run in sixty-first place by twenty seconds ahead of Mauritius' Aurelie Halbwachs, with a time of 3:51:51.

Major results

Track

2004
 1st  Points race, Asian Track Championships
2006
 3rd  Points race, Asian Games
2007
 1st  Individual pursuit, Southeast Asian Games
2008
 2nd  Points race, Asian Track Championships
2009
 Asian Track Championships
2nd  Points race
2nd  Team pursuit
3rd  Individual pursuit
2010
 3rd  Points race, Asian Games
 3rd  Individual pursuit, Asian Track Championships
2011
 2nd  Individual pursuit, Asian Track Championships
2013
 3rd Points race, ACC Track Asia Cup – Thailand Round
2014
 2nd  Points race, Asian Track Championships
 3rd Individual pursuit, Track Clubs ACC Cup

Road

2004
 Asian Road Championships
2nd  Road race
4th Time trial
2005
 2nd  Road race, Southeast Asian Games
2007
 2nd  Time trial, Southeast Asian Games
 4th Time trial, Asian Road Championships
2008
 2nd  Time trial, Asian Road Championships
 4th Overall Tour of Chongming Island
2009
 Asian Road Championships
2nd  Time trial
4th Road race
 2nd  Time trial, Southeast Asian Games
2010
 2nd  Road race, Thailand National Games
 3rd  Time trial, Asian Games
2011
 Southeast Asian Games
1st  Time trial
2nd  Road race
 1st  Time trial, Asian Road Championships
2012
 4th Time trial, Asian Road Championships
2013
 Southeast Asian Games
2nd  Time trial
9th Road race
 6th Time trial, Asian Road Championships
2014
 8th Time trial, Asian Road Championships
2015
 Southeast Asian Games
2nd  Time trial
9th Road race
 6th Time trial, Asian Road Championships
2019
 8th Time trial, Southeast Asian Games
2020
 National Road Championships
2nd Time trial
2nd Road race
 8th Overall Tour of Thailand
2021
 3rd Road race, National Road Championships
 6th Overall Tour of Thailand
2022
 7th Overall Princess Maha Chakri Sirindhon's Cup Tour of Thailand

References

External links

NBC 2008 Olympics profile

1984 births
Living people
Chanpeng Nontasin
Chanpeng Nontasin
Cyclists at the 2008 Summer Olympics
Chanpeng Nontasin
Asian Games medalists in cycling
Cyclists at the 2002 Asian Games
Cyclists at the 2006 Asian Games
Cyclists at the 2010 Asian Games
Cyclists at the 2014 Asian Games
Chanpeng Nontasin
Medalists at the 2006 Asian Games
Medalists at the 2010 Asian Games
Southeast Asian Games medalists in cycling
Chanpeng Nontasin
Chanpeng Nontasin
Competitors at the 2009 Southeast Asian Games
Competitors at the 2011 Southeast Asian Games
Chanpeng Nontasin